Coleophora solitariella is a moth of the family Coleophoridae. It is found from Fennoscandia to the Pyrenees, Italy and Romania and from Great Britain to southern Russia.

The wingspan is 10–13 mm.

The larvae feed on Arenaria serpyllifolia, Cerastium arvense, Cerastium glomeratum, Myosoton aquaticum, Stellaria alsine, Stellaria holostea, Stellaria media, Stellaria nemorum and Stellaria uliginosa. Full-grown larvae live in a slender greyish white three-valved tubular silken case of about 8 mm. The mouth angle is about 45°. There are often several cases together on a small number of plants. Full-grown cases can be found in May.

References

External links
 
 Coleophora solitariella at ukmoths

solitariella
Moths described in 1849
Moths of Europe
Taxa named by Philipp Christoph Zeller